McDougald-McLendon Arena is a 3,500-seat multi-purpose arena in Durham, North Carolina. Opened in 1950, it is home to the North Carolina Central University Eagles basketball and volleyball teams.

Arena namesake John McLendon helped organize "The Secret Game" between then named North Carolina College and Duke University Medical School in 1944, which was the first fully integrated college basketball game.

Gallery

See also
 List of NCAA Division I basketball arenas

References

College basketball venues in the United States
North Carolina Central Eagles men's basketball
Basketball venues in North Carolina
Sports venues in Durham, North Carolina
1950 establishments in North Carolina
Sports venues completed in 1950
College volleyball venues in the United States